Pitthea neavei, or Neave's highflier, is a moth of the family Geometridae first described by Louis Beethoven Prout in 1915. It is found in Malawi and Congo.

This species has a wingspan of 37–43 mm.

References

External links
 Includes images.

Ennominae
Lepidoptera of the Democratic Republic of the Congo
Lepidoptera of Malawi
Moths of Sub-Saharan Africa